Helena Dragaš (Jelena Dragaš, Helénē Dragásē; c. 1372 – 23 March 1450) was the empress consort of Byzantine emperor Manuel II Palaiologos and mother of the last two emperors, John VIII Palaiologos and Constantine XI Palaiologos. She served as regent after the death of her son John VIII in 1448 until 1449.

Later in life she became a nun. She is venerated as a saint by the Eastern Orthodox Church under her monastic name, as Saint Hypomone, translated in English as Saint Patience.

Life 
Helena was the daughter of Serbian magnate Konstantin Dejanović, a Serbian magnate during the fall of the Serbian Empire that held Kyustendil. Her mother was Konstantin's unnamed first wife and Konstantin was the grandson of Serbian king Stefan III Dečanski. Her stepmother, Eudokia of Trebizond, was a daughter of Alexios III of Trebizond and Theodora Kantakouzene, and the widow of Tadjeddin Pasha of Sinop, Emir of Limnia. Her father fell at the battle of Rovine (1395), while fighting for his overlord, Ottoman sultan Bayezid I against Mircea I of Wallachia.

Empress 
Helena married Manuel II Palaiologos in 1392. She became an empress in 1399. She was well known for her beauty, piety, wisdom, and justice.

In 1425, her husband abdicated and became a monk with the name Matthew.  After his death, on 21 July 1425, she became a nun at the Monastery of Kyra Martha, taking her monastic name.  She helped to establish a home for old people, with the name "The Hope of the Despaired". The home was located at the Monastery of St. John in Petrion, where the relics of St. Patapius of Thebes are also kept.

When her eldest son, John VIII, died in 1448, the succession was disputed between Constantine, her eldest remaining son and John's chosen heir, and his ambitious but inept younger brother, Demetrios. As empress dowager, Helena backed Constantine. She served as regent after the death of her son John VIII in 1448, until the arrival of his successor Constantine XI from Mistra in 1449 She eventually persuaded Sultan Murad II to intervene in Constantine's favour, leading to his assumption of the throne in January 1449. When Constantine became emperor, he referred to himself as Constantine XI Dragases Palaiologos, after Helena.

Helena died on 23 March 1450 in Constantinople. She is venerated by the Orthodox Church as a saint, and her memory is commemorated on 29 May, the day of the Fall of Constantinople to the Ottomans and of the death of her son Constantine XI. Her skull, as a holy relic, is treasured in the Monastery of Saint Patapios in Loutraki, Greece.

Marriage and issue 

On 10 February 1392, Helena married Manuel II Palaiologos. They had several children. The list follows the order of births given by George Sphrantzes: 
 A daughter. Mentioned as the eldest daughter but not named. Possibly confused with Isabella Palaiologina, an illegitimate daughter of Manuel II known to have married Ilario Doria.
 Constantine Palaiologos. Died young.
 John VIII Palaiologos (18 December 1392 – 31 October 1448). Byzantine emperor, 1425–1448.
 Theodore II Palaiologos (d. 1448).
 A second daughter. Also not named in the text.
 Andronikos Palaiologos (d. 1429).
 Michael Palaiologos. Died young.
 Constantine XI Palaiologos (8 February 1405 – 29 May 1453). Despotēs in the Morea and subsequently the last Byzantine emperor, 1448–1453.
 Demetrios Palaiologos (c. 1407–1470). Despotēs in the Morea.
 Thomas Palaiologos (c. 1409 – 12 May 1465). Despotēs in the Morea.

References

Sources

Further reading
 "Life, akolouthia, paraklitikos kanonas and egomia of the holy mother ‘’Saint Hypomone" [Dr. Charalambos Busias, edition of Holy Monastery of Saint Patapios, Loutraki 1999]
 "Saint Hipomoni: History and asmatiki akolouthia" [Archpriest Makrystathis Sotirios, Athens, 1993]
 "Kanon parakletikos & Hairetistirioi oikoi to the Blessed Mother's Saint Hypomone" [Dr. Charalambos Busias, edition of the Holy Monastery of Saint Patapios Loutraki 2007]
"The Holy Monastery of Saint Patapios in Loutraki" [edition of the Metropolis of Corinth, Sikyon, Zemenou, Tarsus and Polyfengous, 2012].
«The Greek Monasteries» [Ev. Lekkou, Ihnilatis, Athens, 1995].
 "Agiologio of Orthodoxy," [Christos Tsolakidis, Athens, 2001 edition]
 «O Megas Synaxaristis of the Orthodox Church" Saint Patapios, p. (254) - (261) [m Victoras Mattheos, 3rd edition, Metamorfosi Sotiros Monastery, Athens, 1968]
 "Saint Patapios" [Stylianos Papadopoulos, professor of the University of Athens, Holy Monastery of Saint Patapios, Loutraki, Greece, edition 2006].
 "St. Patapios and his miracles," [Dr. Charalambos Busias, edition of Holy Monastery of Saint Patapios Loutraki 2004]
 "Deltos of Miracles of our miraculous father St. Patapios" [Dr. Charalambos Busias, edition of Holy Monastery of Saint Patapios 4th Edition, Loutraki 2011]

External links
Information about St Hypomone from the Church of Sparta
 

|-

1372 births
1450 deaths
Palaiologos dynasty
14th-century Byzantine empresses
15th-century Byzantine empresses
15th-century viceregal rulers
15th-century Byzantine nuns
14th-century Serbian royalty
15th-century Serbian royalty
Byzantine saints of the Eastern Orthodox Church
Medieval Serbian princesses
14th-century Serbian women
15th-century women rulers
Mothers of Byzantine emperors